The 1996–97 Australian Figure Skating Championships were the national championships of the 1996–97 figure skating season. Skaters competed in the disciplines of men's singles, ladies' singles, pair skating, and ice dancing across many levels, including senior, junior, novice, adult, and the pre-novice disciplines of primary and intermediate.

Senior results

Men

Ladies

Pairs

Ice dancing

External links
 results

1996 in figure skating
1997 in figure skating
Australian Figure Skating Championships
Fig
Fig